York Bruno Larese (July 18, 1938 – February 6, 2016) was an American basketball player and coach.

Amateur career
Larese was born in New York City and attended St. Ann's Academy (now Archbishop Molloy High School) in Queens. A 6'4" (1.93 m) guard, he attended the University of North Carolina, leading the Atlantic Coast Conference in foul shooting in 1959-60 with 86.8 percent, which stood as the single-season UNC mark for 25 years. (That season included a 21-for-21 effort against Duke, which is still an ACC record.) Larese was twice selected third-team All-American (in 1958-59 and 1960-61).

Pro career
Larese was one of the few players drafted twice by the NBA (whose rules at the time permitted this). First, he was selected by the St. Louis Hawks (now Atlanta Hawks) in the 1960 NBA Draft, but chose to return to Chapel Hill; he was drafted again in 1961, this time by the Chicago Packers (now the Washington Wizards). Larese played eight games for Chicago before being waived on November 29, 1961; the Philadelphia Warriors signed him as a free agent the next day. Larese played 60 games for the Warriors (51 in the regular season and nine in the playoffs), including Wilt Chamberlain's famous 100-point game. (Larese scored nine points in that contest, and would often joke that he and Wilt scored 109 points between them.) After being cut by the Warriors, Larese began a seven-year career in the Eastern League, winning a championship with the Allentown Jets in 1965. He played from 1966-69 with the EBA's Hartford Capitols, taking over as player/coach in 1968.

Coaching career
In 1969, Larese moved up to the big-league basketball coaching ranks, taking the reins of the New York Nets of the ABA. The job was temporary, however; Larese agreed to coach the Nets for only one season, while Lou Carnesecca got out of his contract helming St. John's. After a 39-45 record and a fourth-place finish, Larese took a job with a shoe firm, Converse Rubber Co., on Long Island. In January 1971, Larese returned to Allentown to take over his old team, the Jets. After leading Allentown to the EBA playoffs that spring, however, Larese found that coaching the Jets was taking too much time away from his executive position at the shoe company, and so resigned at the end of the year.

Personal life
York Larese was married to Barbara (Connally) Trockman and father of two sons (Keith and York, Jr.) and two daughters (Kimberly and Karen). He died in February 6, 2016 at the age of 77.

References

External links
 BasketballReference.com: York Larese (as player)
 BasketballReference.com: York Larese (as coach)

1938 births
2016 deaths
All-American college men's basketball players
Allentown Jets players
American men's basketball coaches
American men's basketball players
Basketball coaches from New York (state)
Basketball players from New York City
Chicago Packers draft picks
Chicago Packers players
Hartford Capitols players
New York Nets head coaches
North Carolina Tar Heels men's basketball players
Philadelphia Warriors players
Point guards
Shooting guards
St. Ann's Academy (Manhattan) alumni
St. Louis Hawks draft picks
Eastern Basketball Association coaches